Serhiy Hrybanov (born 17 November 1981) is a Ukrainian former professional footballer who played as a striker.

Honours
Individual
 Desna Chernihiv Player of the Year: 2010

External links
 Profile at Official FFU Website (Ukr)

1981 births
Living people
Sportspeople from Mariupol
Ukrainian footballers
FC Shakhtar-2 Donetsk players
FC Shakhtar-3 Donetsk players
FC Illichivets-2 Mariupol players
FC Mariupol players
SC Tavriya Simferopol players
FC Stal Alchevsk players
FC Desna Chernihiv players
FC Oleksandriya players
FC Sevastopol players
FC Olimpik Donetsk players
Ukrainian Premier League players
Association football forwards